Sharon MacDonell is a Democratic member of the Michigan House of Representatives from the 56th House District, which encompasses parts of Troy, Clawson, Royal Oak, Birmingham, and Bloomfield Township. She was elected to her first term in 2022 and assumed office on January 1, 2023.

Early life and education 
MacDonell was born on April 9th, 1962 in Bethpage, New York. MacDonell grew up in Michigan and graduated from the University of Michigan with a Bachelor of Arts in history. MacDonell then worked for several automotive and broadcasting firms as a journalist, marketing professional, and video producer.

Political career 
MacDonell In 2022, MacDonell successfully ran as a Democrat for the Michigan House of Representatives 56th district, defeating the Republican candidate Mark Gunn.

Committee Assignments 

 Energy, Communications and Technology
 Families, Children and Seniors
 Higher Education
 Transportation, Mobility and Infrastructure (Majority Vice Chair)
 Health Policy subcommittee on Behavioral Health

Electoral history

References 

Living people
University of Michigan alumni
Democratic Party members of the Michigan House of Representatives
People from Bethpage, New York
Women state legislators in Michigan
21st-century American politicians
21st-century American women politicians